Gerard Kelly (Irish: Gearard Ó Ceallaigh; born 5 April 1953) is an Irish republican politician and former Provisional Irish Republican Army (IRA) member who played a leading role in the negotiations that led to the Good Friday Agreement on 10 April 1998. He is currently a member of Sinn Féin's Ard Chomhairle (National Executive) and a Member of the Northern Ireland Assembly (MLA) for North Belfast.

Old Bailey attack
 
The IRA planted four car bombs in London on 8 March 1973. Two of the car bombs were defused: a fertilizer bomb in a car outside the Post Office in Broadway and the BBC's armed forces radio studio in Dean Stanley Street. However, the other two exploded, one near the Old Bailey and the other at Ministry of Agriculture off Whitehall. As a result of the explosions one person died and almost 200 people were injured.

Kelly, then aged 19, and eight others, including Hugh Feeney and sisters Marian and Dolours Price, were found guilty of various charges relating to the bombings on 14 November 1973. Kelly was convicted of causing explosions and conspiracy to cause explosions, and received two life sentences plus twenty years.

Imprisonment and hunger strike
Upon imprisonment in Britain, Kelly, and the other prisoners went on hunger strike demanding political prisoner status and to be transferred to prisons in Northern Ireland. After 60 days on hunger strike, during which he subsequently alleged he was force-fed by prison officers, Kelly was transferred to HMP Maze prison in Northern Ireland in April 1975.

While imprisoned in the Maze, Kelly again went on protest and made a number of escape attempts in 1977, 1982 and 1983. On 25 September 1983, Kelly was involved in the Maze Prison escape, the largest break-out of prisoners in Europe since World War II and in UK prison history. Kelly, along with 37 other republican prisoners, armed with six hand-guns, hijacked a prison meals lorry and smashed their way out of the Maze past 40 prison officers and 28 alarm systems. During the escape Kelly shot a prison officer, who attempted to foil the escape, in the head with a gun that had been smuggled into the jail. The officer survived.

After the mass break-out Kelly was on the run for three years and again became involved in IRA activity in Europe. Whilst on the run Kelly claimed he was aided in his escape by "all kinds of people", including prominent Fianna Fáil and Fine Gael supporters in the Republic of Ireland.

On 16 January 1986, Kelly was arrested in the Netherlands along with Brendan "Bik" McFarlane at their flat in Amsterdam. At the time of their arrest, cash in several currencies, maps and fake passports and the keys to a storage container holding 14 rifles, 100,000 rounds of ammunition and nitrobenzene were recovered by the Dutch police.

On 4 December 1986, the pair were extradited from the Netherlands to the United Kingdom by RAF helicopter and were returned to the Maze prison. On 2 June 1989 Kelly was released in line with the extradition conditions agreed on with the Dutch authorities.

Political career
Upon leaving prison, Kelly became actively involved in politics, becoming a leading member of Sinn Féin. Kelly and fellow Sinn Féin member Martin McGuinness both engaged in protracted secret negotiations with representatives of the British Government from 1990 until 1993. Kelly also published a collection of poetry, Words from a Cell, in 1989.
Kelly played a role in the Northern Ireland peace process negotiations that led to the Good Friday Agreement on 10 April 1998. In promoting the peace process he had talks with Nelson Mandela, Thabo Mbeki, Bill Clinton, Tony Blair and Bertie Ahern.

On 27 June 1998, he was elected to the Northern Ireland Assembly. He was Deputy Chair of the Social Development Committee in the 1998-2003 Assembly, and is currently Sinn Féin Spokesperson for Policing and Justice, and a political member of the Northern Ireland Policing Board.

In 2013, aged 60, Kelly was criticised by other MLAs (Members of the Legislative Assembly) in Northern Ireland, for holding on to the front of a Police Service of Northern Ireland vehicle, as it drove away with him during a protest in his constituency.

Kelly was a Sinn Féin representative during the talks chaired by Richard Haass in 2013 on contentious issues in Northern Ireland.

Cultural references 
In the 2017 film Maze dramatising the 1983 prison break, directed by Stephen Burke, Kelly was portrayed by Irish actor Patrick Buchanan.

References

External links
 
 On This Day - 1973: IRA gang convicted of London bombings from BBC News
 Biography - Gerry Kelly Northern Ireland Assembly
Gerry Kelly's "They work for you" page
NIA profile

1953 births
Escapees from British detention
Irish republicans
Living people
Members of the Northern Ireland Forum
Junior ministers of the Northern Ireland Assembly (since 1999)
Northern Ireland MLAs 1998–2003
Northern Ireland MLAs 2003–2007
Northern Ireland MLAs 2007–2011
Northern Ireland MLAs 2011–2016
Northern Ireland MLAs 2016–2017
Northern Ireland MLAs 2017–2022
Politicians from Belfast
Prisoners accorded Special Category Status
Prisoners sentenced to life imprisonment by England and Wales
Provisional Irish Republican Army members
Republicans imprisoned during the Northern Ireland conflict
Sinn Féin MLAs
Sinn Féin parliamentary candidates
Northern Ireland MLAs 2022–2027